Herznach-Ueken is a municipality in the district of Laufenburg in the canton of Aargau in Switzerland. It was established on 1 January 2023 with the merger of the municipalities of Herznach and Ueken.

History
On 1 January 2023, the two municipalities of Herznach and Ueken merged to form the new municipality of Herznach-Ueken.

Coat of arms
The first blazon of the municipal coat of arms is Gules a Pitcher Vert lip dexter and handled Or.  The pitcher on the coat of arms is an attribute of Saint Verena to whom the chapel of Herznach is devoted. The second blazon is Or a St.Catherine's Wheel Sable.

References

External links

Municipalities of Aargau
2023 establishments in Switzerland